Into the Storm is the first book of the Destroyermen series of alternate history novels by Taylor Anderson. The main setting of the series is the four-stacker USS Walker, which in this series is part of the United States Asiatic Fleet, and being pursued by the Japanese battlecruiser Amagi.

Plot synopsis
In 1942, the American destroyer USS Walker (DD-163), a World War I 'four-piper', is part of the United States Asiatic Fleet. Lieutenant Commander Matthew Reddy is Walkers captain.

Walker and her sister ship, USS Mahan (DD-102), enter a squall and emerge on an alternate Earth where humans never evolved, but two intelligent races, the Lemurians and the Grik (a race of evolved "dinosaurs" from Africa), are at war.  The Grik have a class system, in which the Uul are the soldiers, workers, etc., and the Hij are the leaders. The Lemurians are peaceful refugees from Madagascar that possibly evolved from lemurs. Reddy meets twice with the Lemurians' leadership. The Lemurians' king and his advisers tell him that others came to their world before him. Reddy and the crew of Walker side with the Lemurians.

References
Review of Into the Storm. Alternate History.com. August 25, 2010.
John Ottinger III. Book Review: Destroyermen – Into the Storm by Taylor Anderson. August 25, 2010

External links
 

2008 novels
American alternate history novels
Destroyermen and Artillerymen